This is a list of Slovak football transfers in the summer transfer window 2013 by club. Only transfers of the Corgoň Liga and 2. liga are included.

Corgoň Liga

ŠK Slovan Bratislava

In:

Out:

FK Senica

In:

Out:

FK AS Trenčín

In:

Out:

Spartak Myjava

In:

Out:

MFK Košice

In:

Out:

MFK Ružomberok

In:

Out:

MŠK Žilina

In:

Out:

FC ViOn Zlaté Moravce

In:

Out:

FK Dukla Banská Bystrica

In:

Out:

FC Nitra

In:

Out:

FC Spartak Trnava

In:

Out:

FK DAC 1904 Dunajská Streda

In:

Out:

2. liga

1. FC Tatran Prešov

In:

Out:

ŽP Šport Podbrezová

In:

Out:

ŠK SFM Senec

In:

Out:

Partizán Bardejov

In:

Out:

FC ŠTK 1914 Šamorín

In:

Out:

FK Slovan Duslo Šaľa

In:

Out:

MFK Zemplín Michalovce

In:

Out:

MŠK Rimavská Sobota

In:

Out:

MFK Dubnica

In:

Out:

MFK Tatran Liptovský Mikuláš

In:

Out:

FC Spartak Trnava juniori

In:

Out:

FK Pohronie

Out:

See also
 2013–14 Corgoň Liga
 2013–14 2. liga

References

External links
 Official site  
 Official site of the SFZ 
 Profutbal.sk 
 Sport.sk 

Slovakia
Transfers
2013